Mercury polycations are polyatomic cations that contain only mercury atoms. The best known example is the  ion, found in mercury(I) (mercurous) compounds. The existence of the metal–metal bond in Hg(I) compounds was established using X-ray studies in 1927 and Raman spectroscopy in 1934 making it one of the earliest, if not the first, metal–metal covalent bonds to be characterised.

Other mercury polycations are the linear  and  ions, and the triangular  ion   and a number of chain and layer polycations.

Mercury(I)

The  ion was perhaps the first metal-metal bonded species confirmed. The presence of the  ion in solution was shown by Ogg in 1898. In 1900, Baker showed the presence of HgCl dimers in the vapour phase. The presence of  units in the solid state was first determined in 1926 using X-ray diffraction. The presence of the metal-metal bond in solution was confirmed using Raman spectroscopy in 1934.

Anions of insoluble salts readily shift the equilibrium: , which forms an insoluble Hg(II) salt, induces complete disproportionation, whereas , which forms an insoluble Hg(I) salt, induces the reverse. Most salts with main group elements tend to contain only Hg(II) and metallic mercury, because the presence of strong Lewis bases destabilizes the intermetallic bond. In appropriate solvents, however, Hg(I) salts with derivatives of amides, pyridines, phosphorus trifluoride, tin(II), and certain other main group elements are all known.  

Minerals that are known that contain the  cation include eglestonite.

Linear trimercury and tetramercury cations

The bonding involves 2-centre-2-electron bonds formed by 6s orbitals.

Cyclic mercury cations

The triangular  cation was confirmed in a reinvestigation of the mineral terlinguaite in 1989 and subsequently synthesised in a number of compounds. The bonding has been described in terms of a three-center two-electron bond where overlap of the 6s orbitals on the mercury atoms gives (in D3h symmetry) a bonding "a1" orbital.

Chain and layer polycations
The golden yellow compound ), named "alchemists' gold" by its discoverers, contains perpendicular chains of Hg atoms.

The "metallic" compounds  and  contain hexagonal layers of mercury atoms separated by layers of  anions. They are both superconductors below 7 K.

References

Mercury compounds
Cations